Mohammad Zubair Umar is a Pakistani politician who served as 32nd Governor of Sindh from February 2017 to August 2018. A prominent leader of the Pakistan Muslim League (N), he served as the Chairman of Privatisation Commission of Pakistan with the status of State Minister from 2013 to 2017. Currently he serves as Chief Spokesperson to Nawaz Sharif's daughter Maryam Safdar.

Early life and education
Umar was born to Ghulam Umar. Umar has lived in Karachi since 1971 and belongs to Muhajir community. Zubair is elder brother to Mr. Asad Umar who is a prominent leader of Imran Khan's Pakistan Tehreek-e-Insaf.

He received his master's degree in business administration from Institute of Business Administration (IBA) in 1981. At IBA, he became the member of the Board of Directors in 1980 and taught Financial Management from 1981 to 1986. After completing his MBA, he joined IBM from 1981 until his resignation in 2007.

Zubair Umar's father, Major General (retd) Ghulam Umar, was an army officer who was considered a close aide and served as first Advisor of National Security Council (NSC) created by the government of President Yahya Khan.

Career
Prior to joining politics, Umar hosted TV shows.

After joining PML-N in 2012, he became part of the PML-N's Economic, Tax Reforms Media Committees.

Umar was chairman of the Pakistan Board of Investment from 12 July 2013 to 17 December 2013.

He served as Chairman of Privatisation Commission of Pakistan with the status of minister of state from December 2013 until February 2017.

In January 2017, he was appointed as the 32nd Governor of Sindh. He took the oath of office in February 2017.

Following the 2018 Pakistani general election, he resigned from the office of Sindh Governor on 28 July 2018. His resignation was accepted on 3 August 2018.

Leaked sextape
On 26 September 2021 sexually explicit videos were posted online by anonymous sources that allegedly show Umar with at least one unidentified woman. The other woman was speculated to be Gharida Farooqi since the woman in the video was also wearing the same pajamas as Gharidah did on her live TV show. Umar and his party (PMLN) leaders claimed the videos were doctored and fake, however, neither he or his party bothered to approach the courts against the videos, hence raising doubts on their own claims.

References

Living people
Pakistan Muslim League (N) politicians
Governors of Sindh
People from Karachi
Muhajir people
Institute of Business Administration, Karachi alumni
Year of birth missing (living people)
Sex scandals
Political sex scandals